The Cove Burying Ground is an historic cemetery located just south of MA 6 and Corliss Way in Eastham, Massachusetts, US. It is Eastham's oldest cemetery, dating to c. 1646. It was laid out not long after the town's first meeting house was built nearby. Although there are no graves marked with 17th-century markers, it is virtually certain that some of Eastham's early settlers are buried here. It was the town's only burying ground until the establishment in 1720 of the Bridge Road Cemetery. The cemetery remained in active use until about 1770. Families placed memorial markers in there in the late 19th and early 20th centuries.

Three of the Mayflowers 1620 original passengers have marked headstones here.  They are:
 Giles Hopkins (1607–1690)
 Lt. Joseph Rogers (1608–1678)
 Constance Hopkins (1605–1677)

The cemetery was added to the National Register of Historic Places in 1999.

See also
 National Register of Historic Places listings in Barnstable County, Massachusetts

References

External links
 

Cemeteries on the National Register of Historic Places in Massachusetts
Cemeteries in Barnstable County, Massachusetts
Eastham, Massachusetts
National Register of Historic Places in Barnstable County, Massachusetts
1646 establishments in Massachusetts
Cemeteries established in the 17th century